Spillane is a family name derived from the Irish (Gaelic) surname Ó Spealáin or Mac Spealáin. It has also been anglicised as Spellman, Spillan, Spilane and Spallon. It may refer to:

People
 Adrian Spillane (born 1994), Gaelic footballer from Ireland
 Daniel Spillane (born 1980), finalist on Australian Idol 2005
 Davy Spillane (born 1959), Irish musician, player of uilleann bagpipes
 Debbie Spillane (born 1955), Australian sports journalist and broadcaster
 John Spillane (born 1961), singer/songwriter from Cork, Ireland
 John David Spillane (1909–1985), Welsh physician
 Johnny Spillane (born 1980), American Nordic combined skier
 Killian Spillane, Gaelic footballer from Ireland
 Michael Spillane (footballer) (born 1989), Irish soccer player
 Mickey Spillane (1918 – 2006), American author of crime novels
 Mickey Spillane (gangster) (1934 - 1977), Irish-American mobster from New York
 Nicole Spillane (born 1988), French and Irish applied mathematician
 Pat Spillane (born 1955), Gaelic footballer from Ireland
 Robert Spillane (born 1995), American football player
 Scott Spillane, American musician
 Tom Spillane (born 1962), Gaelic footballer from Ireland

Other
 Spillane (album), an album by John Zorn dedicated to writer Mickey Spillane

Surnames of Irish origin
Anglicised Irish-language surnames